The de Neufville baronetcy, of Frankfurt in Germany, was a title in the Baronetage of Great Britain. It was created by Queen Anne of Great Britain on 18 March 1709 for Robert de Neufville, born in Frankfurt to the banker Peter de Neufville (1623–1691) and his wife Maria Clinget (?–1673). At the time of his death he was the Postmaster General at the Dutch City of Leiden. Nothing further is known of the bearer or the title, and it is presumed to have become extinct on his death.

De Neufville baronets, of Frankfort (1709)
Sir Robert de Neufville, 1st Baronet (1671–1735)

References

Extinct baronetcies in the Baronetage of Great Britain